was a town in Kinosaki District, Hyōgo Prefecture, Japan.

Merger
On April 1, 2005, Kinosaki, along with the towns of Hidaka and Takeno (all from Kinosaki District), and the towns of Izushi and Tantō (both from Izushi District), were merged into the expanded city of Toyooka and they no longer exist as independent municipalities.

, the Kinosaki district of Toyooka had an estimated population of 3,778.

Tourism

Kinosaki is a resort area, with onsen (Japanese hot springs). The Onsen town has a history of 1,300 years. In 1913, the writer Shiga Naoya came to Kinosaki and stayed there for three weeks. Kinosaki provided the inspiration for his short story, "Kinosaki ni te" or "In Kinosaki".

Onsen Resort 
There are seven public onsen bath houses in Kinosaki Onsen:

 Kouno-yu
 Mandara-yu
 Goshono-yu
 Ichino-yu
 Yanagi-yu
 Jizou-yu
 Satono-yu

Tourists staying in many of the ryokans (Japanese traditional inns) in Kinosaki can receive a free pass to all seven. It is common for tourists staying in Kinosaki Onsen to walk around in yukata, this saves them having to change into their own clothes every time they use an onsen. A ropeway at the far end of the street transports visitors to the top of Mt. Taishi, which has views of the town and coastline, as well as a temple appropriately named Onsenji.

Museums 

Some of the area's specialties in these shops and restaurants include snow crab, Tajima beef, and onsen-boiled eggs.

Transportation

Railway 
The Sanin Main Line provides a JR rail connection to Kyoto, and direct trains to Osaka are available via Fukuchiyama. Direct Express trains take about 2.5 hours from Osaka to Toyooka. A JR Pass (more specifically, a Kansai WIDE Area Pass) can be purchased to travel from Osaka or Kyoto to Kinosaki.

 JR West - San'in Main Line
 Ebara - Kokufu - Toyooka - Gembudō - Kinosaki-Onsen - Takeno
  Kyoto Tango Railway - Miyazu Line
 Toyooka - Kōnotori-no-sato

Highways 
 Japan National Route 178
 Japan National Route 312
 Japan National Route 426
 Japan National Route 482
 Japan National Route 483

Airway 
The Tajima Airport serves Toyooka and runs two direct flights a day to Osaka Itami Airport.

References

External links

Kinosaki Onsen Ropeway

Dissolved municipalities of Hyōgo Prefecture
Spa towns in Japan
Hot springs of Hyōgo Prefecture
Toyooka, Hyōgo